Greg T. Heartsill (born March 14, 1971) is an American politician who served as a member of the Iowa House of Representatives for the 28th district from 2013 to 2019.

Early life and education 
Heartsill was born in Mount Pleasant, Iowa and raised in Salem. He earned an associate's degree in computer science from Indian Hills Community College and Bachelor of Arts in business from Buena Vista University.

Career 
, Heartsill serves on several committees in the Iowa House, including the Judiciary, Public Safety, and Transportation committees. He also served as the vice chair of the HouseGovernment Oversight and Local Government committees. Heartsill did not seek re-election in 2018.

References

External links 

 Representative Greg Heartsill official Iowa General Assembly site
 
 Biography at Ballotpedia
 Financial information (state office) at the National Institute for Money in State Politics

1971 births
Living people
Buena Vista University alumni
Indian Hills Community College alumni
Republican Party members of the Iowa House of Representatives
People from Henry County, Iowa
People from Chariton, Iowa
21st-century American politicians
People from Mount Pleasant, Iowa